The American Family Field Walk of Fame is an exhibit located at American Family Field in Milwaukee, Wisconsin, that commemorates baseball players, coaches, executives, and broadcasters who have made significant contributions to Major League Baseball (MLB) in Milwaukee. Established by the Milwaukee Brewers MLB team in 2001 with the opening of the stadium, it encompasses the entire history of the Brewers since 1970 and that of the Milwaukee Braves, who played in the city from 1953 to 1965. Twenty-one individuals have been inducted as of 2022.

Each inductee is honored with a home plate-shaped granite slab featuring their name, uniform number, signature, and years associated with Milwaukee baseball. The slabs are arranged around American Family Field, circling the stadium and culminating with the statues of Hall of Famers Hank Aaron and Robin Yount, former team owner and Commissioner of Baseball Bud Selig, and broadcaster Bob Uecker.

Unlike the Milwaukee Brewers Wall of Honor exhibit at American Family Field, which honors only former Brewers who meet set criteria regarding career milestones or service time, individuals are elected to the Walk of Fame by Wisconsin media members and Brewers executives. Annual ballots include Brewers and Braves who were members of either team for a minimum of three seasons and have been retired for at least three years. Anyone named on 65% or more of all ballots cast is elected. Individuals must receive at least 5% of the vote to remain eligible in future years.

Inductees

References

External links
Official website

Walk
Awards established in 2001
Halls of fame in Wisconsin
Major League Baseball museums and halls of fame
Walks of fame